The Methodist Episcopal Church in Lancaster, Kentucky is a historic Methodist Episcopal church.  Located on Stanford Street, it has also been known as the Lancaster United Methodist Church.  It was built in 1896 and added to the National Register in 1984.

The Methodist congregation dated back to at least 1815.  It acquired this church's property from the Presbyterian church in 1878 and rebuilt the church starting in 1894, with foundation dated 1896.  It was deemed notable as one of two remaining brick Gothic Revival churches in Lancaster.

References

Churches in Garrard County, Kentucky
Lancaster, Kentucky
Methodist churches in Kentucky
Churches on the National Register of Historic Places in Kentucky
Gothic Revival church buildings in Kentucky
Churches completed in 1896
19th-century Methodist church buildings in the United States
National Register of Historic Places in Garrard County, Kentucky
Methodist Episcopal churches in the United States
1896 establishments in Kentucky